Dental (or more precisely denti-alveolar) clicks are a family of click consonants found, as constituents of words, only in Africa and in the Damin ritual jargon of Australia. 

In English, the tut-tut! (British spelling, "tutting") or tsk! tsk! (American spelling, "tsking") sound used to express disapproval or pity is an unreleased dental click, although it is not a lexical phoneme (a sound that distinguishes words) in English but a paralinguistic speech-sound. Similarly paralinguistic usage of dental clicks is made in certain other languages, but the meaning thereof differs widely between many of the languages (e.g., affirmation in Somali but negation in many varieties of Arabic).

Prior to 1989,  was the IPA letter for the dental clicks. It is still occasionally used where the symbol  would be confounded with other symbols, such as prosody marks, or simply because in many fonts the vertical bar is indistinguishable from an el or capital i. Either letter may be combined with a second letter to indicate the manner of articulation, though this is commonly omitted for tenuis clicks. 

In official IPA transcription, the click letter is combined with a  via a tie bar, though  is frequently omitted. Either letter, whether baseline or superscript, is usually placed before the click letter, but may come after when the release of the velar or uvular occlusion is audible. A third convention is the click letter with diacritics for voicelessness, voicing and nasalization; it does not distinguish velar from uvular dental clicks. Common dental clicks are:

The last is what is heard in the sound sample at right, as non-native speakers tend to glottalize clicks to avoid nasalizing them.

In the orthographies of individual languages, the letters and digraphs for dental clicks may be based on either the vertical bar symbol of the IPA, or on the Latin  of Bantu convention. Nama and most Saan languages use the former; Naro, Sandawe, and Zulu use the latter.

Features
Features of dental clicks:

The forward place of articulation is typically dental (or denti-alveolar) and laminal, which means it is articulated with the tip of the tongue against the alveolar ridge or the upper teeth, but depending on the language may be interdental or even apical. The release is a noisy, affricate-like sound.

Occurrence
Dental clicks are common in Khoisan languages and the neighboring Nguni languages, such as Zulu and Xhosa. In the Nguni languages, the tenuis click is denoted by the letter c, the murmured click by gc, the aspirated click by ch, and the nasal click by nc. The prenasalized clicks are written ngc and nkc.

The Cushitic language Dahalo has four clicks, all of them nasalized: .

Dental clicks may also be used para-linguistically.  For example, English speakers use a plain dental click, usually written tsk or tut (and often reduplicated tsk-tsk or tut-tut; these spellings often lead to spelling pronunciations  or ), as an interjection to express commiseration, disapproval, irritation, or to call a small animal.  German ( or ), Hungarian, Persian, Portuguese, Russian (sound file) Spanish and French speakers use the dental click in exactly the same way as English.

The dental click is also used para-linguistically in Semitic languages such as Arabic, Hebrew and Indo-European Pashto, and Persian where it is transcribed as / and is also used as a negative response to a "yes or no" question (including Dari and Tajiki).  It is also used in some languages spoken in regions closer to, or in, Europe, such as Turkish, Albanian, Greek, Bulgarian, Italian, Portuguese, Spanish, Romanian or Serbo-Croatian to denote a negative response to a "yes or no" question. The dental click is sometimes accompanied by an upward motion of the head.

See also
Lateral click
Alveolar click
Bilabial click
Palatal click
Retroflex click
Index of phonetics articles

Notes

References

External links
 

Dental consonants
Click consonants